Nepotilla minuta, common name the minute turrid, is a species of sea snail, a marine gastropod mollusk in the family Raphitomidae.

Daphnella minuta Verco, 1909 is a synonym of Nepotilla mimica (Sowerby III, 1896), according to Hedley (1922).

Description
The length of the shell attains 6 mm.

(Original description) The minute shell is  fusiform, turreted, elongate and thin. It is saturated with a reddish chestnut. It contains 6 convex whorls, including the protoconch. They are spirally many keeled and between the keels thickly and slenderly longitudinally lirate. The protoconch consists of two subinflated whorls which are spirally and equally striate. The aperture is shorter than the spire, elongately ovate. The outer lip is thin and sinuous. The inner lip is inconspicuous.

Distribution
This marine species is endemic to Australia and occurs off South Australia, Tasmania and Victoria.

References

 Sowerby, G.B. (3rd) 1897. List of Pleurotomidae of South Australia, with descriptions of some new species. Proceedings of the Malacological Society of London 2: 24-32
 Tate, R. & May, W.L. 1901. A revised census of the marine Mollusca of Tasmania. Proceedings of the Linnean Society of New South Wales 26(3): 344-471 
 May, W.L. 1923. An Illustrated Index of Tasmanian Shells: with 47 plates and 1052 species. Hobart : Government Printer 100 pp.

External links
 
 Grove, S.J. (2018). A Guide to the Seashells and other Marine Molluscs of Tasmania: Nepotilla minuta

minuta
Gastropods described in 1877
Gastropods of Australia